Events in the year 1872 in Argentina.

Incumbents
 President: Domingo Faustino Sarmiento
 Vice President: Adolfo Alsina

Governors
 Buenos Aires Province: Emilio de Castro y Rocha (until 3 May); Mariano Acosta (from 3 May)
 Cordoba: Juan Antonio Álvarez
 Mendoza Province: Arístides Villanueva
 Santa Fe Province: Simón de Iriondo

Vice Governors
 Buenos Aires Province: vacant

Events
date unknown - The Argentine government awards the concession for the Buenos Aires and Pacific Railway to John E. Clark for the construction of a railway from Buenos Aires to Chile.

Births
date unknown - Ángel de Estrada, poet and novelist (died 1923)

Deaths
June 22 - Rudecindo Alvarado, military leader (born 1792)

References

 
1870s in Argentina
History of Argentina (1852–1880)
Years of the 19th century in Argentina